A Bu (born Dai Liang, 1999 in Beijing) is a Chinese jazz pianist and composer.

Life 
A Bu studied classical piano and jazz piano at the Central Conservatory of Music, Beijing at the age of nine and, from September 2014, at the Juilliard School in New York under Hung-Kuan Chen. After standing in for a performer at the 2012 Nine Gates festival, he was scouted by Sennheiser, later releasing multiple albums with their record label. 

In 2013, he performed an unplanned improvised with Chick Corea at the JZ Festival. In 2015 he won first place in the Parmigiana Jazz Solo Piano Competition at the Montreux Jazz Festival in Switzerland. Also in 2015, A Bu was invited by Unesco to play at the International Jazz Day All-Star Global Concert.

On November 21, 2016 he premiered Nikolai Kapustin's Nocturne in G major for piano and orchestra op. 16 in Moscow, accompanied by the Moscow Jazz Orchestra conducted by Igor Butman.

Discography 

 88 Tones of Black and White; Sennheiser (Harmonia Mundi), 2014
 Butterflies Fly in Pairs, with Tom Kennedy (Bass) and Ryan J. Lee (Drums); Sennheiser (Harmonia Mundi), 2016
 One Step East, with Larry Grenadier (Bass) and Eric Harland (Drums); Jz Music, 2021

References 

1999 births
Chinese musicians
Chinese people
Jazz composers
Jazz pianists
Living people